Tsentralnyi Profsoyuz Stadion may refer to:
 Tsentralnyi Profsoyuz Stadion (Murmansk)
 Tsentralnyi Profsoyuz Stadion (Voronezh)